Berkshire Grey, Inc. is an American technology company based in Bedford Massachusetts that develops integrated artificial intelligence (“AI") and robotic solutions for e-commerce, retail replenishment, and logistics.  The company's systems automate pick, pack and sort operations.

History 
Berkshire Grey was founded in 2013 by Tom Wagner. He was previously chief technology officer of iRobot.  Chief Scientist for Berkshire Grey is Matthew T. Mason, former Director of the Robotics Institute at Carnegie Mellon University, and author of two highly cited textbooks on robotic manipulation.  Mason was given the IEEE Robotics and Automation Award in 2018.  The Berkshire Grey team is staffed with alumni from Uber, Kiva Systems, Tesla, and Carnegie Mellon University.

In December 2018, Berkshire Grey announced it has been selling AI-enabled robotics for retailers and logistics companies, automating tasks not previously performed by machines in commercial settings.

In August, 2019, SoftBank announced it had struck a deal with Berkshire Grey.  The deal secured $263 million in series B funding, led by Softbank. The Financial Times reported at that time "Berkshire Grey emerged from five years of secretive development late last year."

ABB, a multinational corporation that operates mainly in robotics, power, heavy electrical equipment, and automation technology areas, in 2019 announced they gave Berkshire Grey their "Most Innovative Solutions” Award.

As of April 2020, media reports indicated Berkshire Grey's robotic solutions had handled millions of items and containers in production facilities.

In February 2021, Berkshire Grey Inc. announced that it plans to go public through a merger with special-purpose acquisition company Revolution Acceleration Acquisition Corp. (RAAC) bringing their valuation to $2.7 billion.  Chief Executive of RAAC is John Delaney, a former member of the U.S. House of Representatives.

Berkshire Grey's customers include Walmart, Inc., Target Corp., and FedEx Corp.

The company says its technology will help its customers to compete with Amazon, which has invested billions into automation.

Offering different robotics that include picking, gripping and image sensing, Berkshire Grey has more than 300 patents in the area.  Justia lists 59 patents as granted since 2018.

Berkshire Grey plans to use contract manufacturing partners for the robot, camera and conveyor belt parts. They will then assemble them into a finished product with their own employees on-site at the customer location.

In March 2021, Berkshire Grey collaborated with CEVA Logistics to implement robotic automation systems at CEVA's Vancouver eCommerce facility. CEVA used Berkshire Grey's Robotic Product Sortation and Identification system to autonomously identify and sort eCommerce packages.

References

External links 

AI companies
American companies established in 2013
Robotics companies of the United States
Companies based in Lexington, Massachusetts
Technology companies based in the Boston area